Vivonne Bay is a bay in the Australian state of South Australia located on the south coast of Kangaroo Island about  from Kingscote, the island's main town, and which was named by the members of Baudin expedition to Australia who visited the bay in January 1803.  In a survey of 10,000 beaches by Professor Andrew Short, director of Sydney University's marine studies centre, the beach at Vivonne Bay was adjudged as the best in Australia.

Description

Location

Extent 
While the American source does nominate an eastern extremity, the official Australian source does not.

Depth
The bay is reported as being suitable as an anchorage where there is a need to shelter from northerly and westerly winds. However, the bay is considered to be unsuitable as an anchorage in the case of "fresh SE winds" as "there is no space to get underway if the wind increases and a sea is raised."

Coastline
Point Ellen is described as being "a grassy mound 8.5m high" that is  "bordered by low rocks at its base" and is formed of a "Pleistocene aeolianite, i.e. a "dune limestone." Two rivers, the Harriet and the Eleanor, flow into the bay with the Harriet being located at the west end and the Eleanor located at the east end. The Harriet River has an estuary coastal lagoon system at its mouth due to the local absence of the "bedrock cliffs" that dominate Kangaroo Island’s coastline.

History

European discovery
The bay was named by a member of the Baudin expedition to Australia in January 1803 after one of the following persons - Louis Victor de Rochechouart de Mortemart (1636-1688), a Marshal of France or Catherine de Vivonne, marquise de Rambouillet (1588-1665), a member of the French nobility.   Two sources state that the bay was named by Nicolas Baudin while a third source states that Baudin himself did not visit the southern coast of Kangaroo Island and that it was explored by the Casuarina commanded by Louis de Freycinet and a fourth which states that the bay was named by François Péron and Freycinet.

2011 drownings
Vivonne Bay is recognised as having a significant undertow and at times a sizeable swell, and is therefore suited only to experienced swimmers.

In April 2011, two Australian tourists drowned when a large wave swept them out to sea as they posed for a photograph with their backs to the water at Point Ellen at the western end of the bay.

Fires
Vivonne Bay was impacted by bushfires in January 2020 which necessitated the evacuation of Vivonne Bay township and surrounding areas on Thursday 9 January 2020

Settlements and port infrastructure
There is some evidence that a shore-based bay whaling station operated in the bay in the 1840s.

A settlement known as Vivonne Bay is located on the coastline near the mouth of the Harriet River. As of 2014, navigation aids within Vivonne Bay consisted of a light on Point Ellen.

See also

Vivonne (disambiguation)
Vivonne Bay Conservation Park

References

Further reading  

Bays of Kangaroo Island